Markečica (in older sources: Markočica) is a village in the Municipality of Oplotnica in eastern Slovenia. It lies on the flatlands south of Oplotnica. The area is part of the traditional region of Styria. The municipality is now included in the Drava Statistical Region.

Mass grave
Markečica is the site of a mass grave from the end of the Second World War. It contains the remains of German prisoners of war murdered in May 1945.

Cultural heritage
The Roman road from Celeia to Poetovio led through the area and parts of the embankments are still visible.

References

External links
Markečica on Geopedia

Populated places in the Municipality of Oplotnica